Terthreutis duosticta is a species of moth of the family Tortricidae. It is found in Taiwan.

The wingspan is about 17 mm. The ground colour of the forewings is cream, the costal and terminal area tinged with ochreous brownish. The strigulae are brownish. The hindwings are brownish cream.

References

Archipini
Moths described in 1929
Moths of Taiwan